Guichon Creek is the name of at least two creeks in British Columbia:

 Guichon Creek (Nicola River) in the Nicola Country
 Guichon Creek (Still Creek) in Burnaby